Crawfish Creek is a stream in the U.S. state of Georgia. It is a tributary to West Chickamauga Creek.

Crawfish Creek received its name from the Cherokee Indians of the area, who saw crayfish in its water. A variant name is "Crayfish Creek".

References

Rivers of Georgia (U.S. state)
Rivers of Walker County, Georgia